The Manyas spirlin (Alburnoides manyasensis) is a species of minnow that is endemic to the Simav River drainage of Lake Kuş, also known as Lake Manyas, in Turkey. It may become threatened as its range is densely inhabited and increasingly industrialized.

References

Manyas spirlin
Freshwater fish of Turkey
Endemic fauna of Turkey
Manyas spirlin